Denis Kostin (born June 21, 1995) is a Russian professional ice hockey goaltender. He is currently playing with HC Sibir Novosibirsk of the Kontinental Hockey League (KHL).

Kostin made his Kontinental Hockey League debut playing with Avangard Omsk during the 2013–14 KHL season.

References

External links

1995 births
Living people
Avangard Omsk players
Dizel Penza players
Omskie Yastreby players
Russian ice hockey goaltenders
HC Sibir Novosibirsk players
Sportspeople from Omsk
Torpedo Nizhny Novgorod players